Jimmy Douglas (born October 6, 1948 in Falkirk, Scotland) is a former Scottish-Canadian soccer midfielder and head coach.  He played professionally in the North American Soccer League and earned fourteen caps for the Canadian national soccer team.

Club career
Born in Scotland, Douglas moved to Canada in 1964 when he was sixteen.  He almost immediately began playing for St. Catharines Heidelberg in the National Soccer League and by 1972 was in the first team. In 1974, he played in the North American Soccer League with the Toronto Metros before returning to St. Catharines Heidelberg for one season and Hamilton Croatia also for one season. In 1977, he played with league rivals Toronto First Portuguese.

He signed with St. Catharines Roma for the 1978 season, and was named the team's captain. He later became coach of St. Catharines Roma Wolves, serving as general manager in at least 2002 and 2003.

In 2002, he was inducted into the St. Catharines Sports Hall of Fame.

International career
Douglas was one of Canada's most talented midfield players. He played 13 'A' internationals including with the World Cup teams of 1972 and 1976 which failed to qualify for their respective finals. Douglas played another ten games with the Canadian Olympic soccer team.  He was captain of the Canadian team during the final rounds of the 1976 Olympics, attracting international attention when he scored Canada's goal in the dying minutes of the game against the Soviet Union.  He also scored Canada's goal in a 1–3 loss to North Korea, which eliminated the Canadians. Douglas also was a member of the Canadian squad at the 1975 Pan American Games.

International goals
Scores and results list Canada's goal tally first.

In April 2001 Douglas was inducted into the Canadian Soccer Hall of Fame.

References

External links
 / Canada Soccer Hall of Fame
 Toronto Metros stats
 
 

1948 births
Living people
Canada men's international soccer players
Canada Soccer Hall of Fame inductees
Canadian soccer coaches
Canadian soccer players
Association football midfielders
Footballers at the 1976 Summer Olympics
North American Soccer League (1968–1984) players
Naturalized citizens of Canada
Olympic soccer players of Canada
Pan American Games competitors for Canada
Footballers at the 1975 Pan American Games
Footballers from Falkirk
Scottish emigrants to Canada
Toronto Blizzard (1971–1984) players
Hamilton Croatia players
St. Catharines Roma Wolves players
Canadian National Soccer League players
Canadian National Soccer League coaches
Toronto First Portuguese players